15 Clerkenwell Close is a building in Islington, London, designed by architect GROUPWORK and completed in 2017. The building's stone façade was controversial when it appeared, as it had not been fully detailed in the building's planning documents. A councillor sitting of Islington Council called for the building's demolition, but this was overturned on appeal. The building won a RIBA National Award in 2018 and was one of six buildings shortlisted for the Stirling Prize in 2021.

History
GROUPWORK originally proposed a building with a loadbearing bronze façade in 2012. While well received by Islington's Planning Case Officer and recommended for planning approval, a dispute between case officer and a newly arrived conservation officer on the use of bronze led GROUPWORK to replace this design with options utilising loadbearing bricks or stone. The conservation officer at the time (now no longer working in planning) stating "give me a stone building like Eric Parry's at Finsbury Square and I'll allow it" (Eric Parry at a joint lecture with Taha pointing out the previous conservation officer had promised "over my dead body will you get planning apporval for the Finsbury Square design". During April 2013 a brick design was approved and two years later prior to construction the stone design. Not having received more than the threshold of five objections when neighbours were consulted the designs were approved through planning case officer delegated powers. Construction work began 2015, completing during 2017. 

On completion, the CEO of Designbridge, the 16 Clerkenwell Close neighbour contacted the councillor sitting as chairman of Planning Committee B, responsible for all planning approvals within the Clerkenwell Ward receiving more than five public objections. Both neighbour and councillor mistakenly thought the building was constructed without approval, having received planning approval by delegated powers without having to be presented to the Planning Committee of councillors. Without realising the error and already campaigning for election and promotion as chair of all planning committees, the councillor began a press campaign stating, "it is the ugliest building I have ever seen, being of brutalist concrete, I have given an order for its demolition". A demolition order was issued during June 2017 and withdrawn the same month on the council receiving copies of full approval notices, drawings for the stone façade and internal department notes and certificates confirming planning and conservation officers and their heads of department had approved and signed off the design and its final details. Still on their election campaign the councillor was informed of the cancellation of the demolition order, maintaining the withdrawal was an error possibly due to a spelling mistake and that it would be reissued. Stating "the building is not stone and if it is then it cannot be loadbearing and any fossils must have been carved by hand on site and are therefore fake", when questioned by Richard Waite of the Architects' Journal. February 2018 another demolition order was issued following "an investigation" by the same councillor because "neighbours were unable to see the stone facade as the drawings had not been placed online for the public to see". On searching both online and original paper files no certificates, drawings, photographs of stone nor internal notes approving the design could be found, only the previously approved brick design option whose drawings were superseded. Additionally, that had approval had been granted for a stone building, the final design differed from the approved design. This order cited the location of the fossils within the stone façade as "[...] deleterious to the conservation area and listed buildings" due to their "haphazard" placement. When copies of the full approved set of information was sent in again, the head of the Planning Enforcment Department replied that as no information relating to a stone design could now be found within the planning department, the constructed building cannot have planning approval and must therefore be demolished. 

Taha was forced to undertake a planning appeal through public enquiry, which was held and led in July 2019 by Rueben Taylor of Landmark Chambers and planning legal expert and solicitor Sarah Fitzpatrick. During cross examination the head of Planning Enforcement admitted to having removed all drawings, documents, certificates and photos proving a stone design had been submitted and approved, and had they been left in the department no demolition order could have been issued. Also admitting he had been informed to do so and only allow a brick option to appear to have been approved, conceding he had broken several points of law. The Planning Inspector's report was issued on behalf of the Office of the Deputy Prime Minister in August 2019, Taha's appeal was successful and the council's planning office was forced to regrant planning permission, ruling that the building "accords with the generality of what had previously been approved" and removed the demolition order.

Taha once lived on the top floor of the building with his family, and the building houses the offices of his architectural practice GROUPWORK.

Design
The building has a limestone façade, with visible fossils embedded in the material. The limestone was sourced from Normandy, and acts as a supportive "exoskeleton" for the building, meaning the interior does not require columns or other supports. Use of limestone sourced from Normandy was inspired by the site's original structure, an 11th-century Norman abbey, also built from limestone, unusual for that time. The building includes a small public park to its left.

Architectural critics cite Alvar Aalto, Carlo Scarpa and Ludwig Mies van der Rohe as inspirations for the structure. Rowan Moore of The Observer and The Guardian stating it is "Poetry in Stone".

Reception
During the Councillor's election campaign Ann Pembroke, of the Clerkenwell Green Preservation Society, was informed of the "illegal building" saying she was "appalled" by its aesthetic departure from the surrounding buildings, adding that "If you want to do something outrageous don't choose a medieval close to put it in." The Clerkenwell Green Preservation Society, which previously had no architects, historians or related members now concede the Close is actually primarily 1970's - 80's buildings constructed in poorly studied pastiches of Victorian and Georgian designs. The vicar of St.James church "the design adds to the neighbourhood, attracting visitors and gaining admiration from our parish". The landlady of The Three Kings public house "no idea why a councillor who doesn't represent our neighbourhood made such a fuss, everyone here apart from one or two likes having the building and its architects' part of our community".

The building won RIBA Regional, RIBA National Award, and was shortlisted for the RIBA Stirling Prize. It is alleged the councillor and his architectural employer recommended 15 Clerkenwell Close to Building Design Magazine to be considered for the Carbuncle Cup.

In contrast to the mixed feedback Taha received for 15 Clerkenwell, his firm's 168 Upper Street, also in Islington, was approved by the borough's planning committee.

References

Residential buildings completed in 2017
Buildings and structures in Clerkenwell
Residential buildings in London
Office buildings in London
Privately owned public spaces